The Slough Half Marathon is a race that takes place every October in Slough, Berkshire, and is run over a distance of .

External links
 Slough Half Marathon web site

Half marathons in the United Kingdom
Athletics competitions in England
Sport in Slough